Demonia may refer to:

 Demonia (film), a 1990 Italian horror film
 Demonia (comics), a member of the Omega Men